The 2014–15 Detroit Pistons season was the 74th season of the franchise, the 67th in the National Basketball Association (NBA), and the 58th in Detroit.

Draft picks

Roster

Standings

Central Division

Eastern Conference

Pre-season

|- style="background:#cfc;"
| 1 
| October 7
| Chicago
| 
| Greg Monroe (24)
| Greg Monroe (9)
| Brandon Jennings (10)
| Palace of Auburn Hills11,081
| 1–0
|- style="background:#cfc;"
| 2 
| October 9
| Milwaukee
| 
| Kentavious Caldwell-Pope (20)
| Andre Drummond (16)
| D. J. Augustin (7)
| Palace of Auburn Hills8,472
| 2–0
|- style="background:#fcc;"
| 3 
| October 12
| @ Washington
|  
| Andre Drummond (21)
| Greg Monroe (10)
| Augustin & Jennings (7)
| Verizon Center11,415
| 2–1
|- style="background:#cfc;"
| 4 
| October 15
| @ Charlotte
| 
| D. J. Augustin (16)
| Greg Monroe (14)
| Brandon Jennings (9)
| Time Warner Cable Arena19,081
| 3–1
|- style="background:#fcc;"
| 5
| October 17
| @ Orlando
| 
| Greg Monroe (24)
| Greg Monroe (10)
| Josh Smith (7)
| Amway Center14,707
| 3–2
|- style="background:#cfc;"
| 6 
| October 18
| @ Atlanta
| 
| Andre Drummond (19)
| Andre Drummond (17)
| Brandon Jennings (11)
| Philips Arena10,560
| 4–2
|- style="background:#cfc;"
| 7 
| October 23
| Philadelphia
| 
| Caron Butler (18)
| Andre Drummond (11)
| D. J. Augustin (11)
| Palace of Auburn Hills11,666
| 5–2

Regular season

Game log

|- style="background:#fcc;"
| 1 
| October 29
| @ Denver
| 
| Josh Smith (25)
| Andre Drummond (9)
| Smith, Caldwell-Pope & Augustin (3)
| Pepsi Center17,136
| 0–1
|- style="background:#fcc;"
| 2
| October 30
| @ Minnesota
| 
| Caron Butler (24)
| Andre Drummond (12)
| D. J. Augustin (6)
| Target Center18,296
| 0–2

|- style="background:#fcc;"
| 3
| November 1
| Brooklyn
| 
| Monroe & Butler (18)
| Greg Monroe (11)
| Brandon Jennings (9)
| Palace of Auburn Hills19,904
| 0–3
|- style="background:#cfc;"
| 4 
| November 5
| New York
| 
| Greg Monroe (23)
| Greg Monroe (18)
| Smith & Jennings (5)
| Palace of Auburn Hills11,915
| 1–3
|- style="background:#cfc;"
| 5 
| November 7
| Milwaukee
| 
| Kentavious Caldwell-Pope (19)
| Andre Drummond (10)
| Brandon Jennings (6)
| Palace of Auburn Hills16,102
| 2–3
|- style="background:#fcc;"
| 6 
| November 9
| Utah
| 
| Brandon Jennings (23)
| Andre Drummond (18)
| Brandon Jennings (5)
| Palace of Auburn Hills12,888
| 2–4
|- style="background:#fcc;"
| 7 
| November 10
| @ Chicago
| 
| Josh Smith (19)
| Andre Drummond (12)
| Brandon Jennings (8)
| United Center21,431
| 2–5
|- style="background:#fcc;"
| 8 
| November 12
| @ Washington
|  
| Brandon Jennings (32)
| Smith & Monroe (9)
| Brandon Jennings (10)
| Verizon Center14,708
| 2–6
|- style="background:#cfc;"
| 9 
| November 14
| @ Oklahoma City
| 
| Brandon Jennings (29)
| Andre Drummond (15)
| Monroe, Jennings & Augustin (5)
| Chesapeake Energy Arena18,203
| 3–6
|- style="background:#fcc;"
| 10 
| November 15
| @ Memphis
| 
| Kyle Singler (21)
| Greg Monroe (11)
| D. J. Augustin (5)
| FedExForum17,215
| 3–7
|- style="background:#fcc;"
| 11 
| November 17
| Orlando
| 
| Caron Butler (20)
| Andre Drummond (10)
| Brandon Jennings (6)
| Palace of Auburn Hills11,619
| 3–8
|- style="background:#fcc;"
| 12 
| November 19
| Phoenix
| 
| Brandon Jennings (19)
| Andre Drummond (13)
| Brandon Jennings (7)
| Palace of Auburn Hills10,686
| 3–9
|- style="background:#fcc;"
| 13 
| November 21
| @ Atlanta
| 
| Josh Smith (16)
| Andre Drummond (16)
| Josh Smith (5)
| Philips Arena16,517
| 3–10
|- style="background:#fcc;"
| 14 
| November 25
| @ Milwaukee
| 
| Andre Drummond (23)
| Smith & Drummond (10)
| Josh Smith (8)
| BMO Harris Bradley Center15,265
| 3–11
|- style="background:#fcc;"
| 15 
| November 26
| L.A. Clippers
| 
| D. J. Augustin (19)
| Andre Drummond (13)
| Smith & Augustin (6)
| Palace of Auburn Hills13,461
| 3–12
|- style="background:#fcc;"
| 16 
| November 28
| Milwaukee
| 
| Andre Drummond (26)
| Andre Drummond (20)
| Josh Smith (9)
| Palace of Auburn Hills13,127
| 3–13
|- style="background:#fcc;"
| 17
| November 30
| Golden State
| 
| Kentavious Caldwell-Pope (23)
| Greg Monroe (10)
| Josh Smith (12)
| Palace of Auburn Hills12,737
| 3–14

|- style="background:#fcc;"
| 18 
| December 2
| L.A. Lakers
| 
| Josh Smith (18)
| Andre Drummond (13)
| Josh Smith (6)
| Palace of Auburn Hills14,083
| 3–15
|- style="background:#fcc;"
| 19 
| December 3
| @ Boston
| 
| Greg Monroe (29)
| Andre Drummond (14)
| Brandon Jennings (12)
| TD Garden15,870
| 3–16
|- style="background:#fcc;"
| 20 
| December 6
| Philadelphia
|  
| Josh Smith (23)
| Greg Monroe (9)
| Josh Smith (7)
| Palace of Auburn Hills16,514
| 3–17
|- style="background:#fcc;"
| 21 
| December 7
| Oklahoma City
| 
| Kentavious Caldwell-Pope (19)
| Andre Drummond (9)
| Brandon Jennings (9)
| Palace of Auburn Hills13,090
| 3–18
|- style="background:#fcc;"
| 22 
| December 9
| Portland
| 
| Greg Monroe (22)
| Andre Drummond (15)
| Jennings & Augustin (6)
| Palace of Auburn Hills12,813
| 3–19
|- style="background:#cfc;"
| 23 
| December 12
| @ Phoenix
| 
| Andre Drummond (23)
| Andre Drummond (14)
| D. J. Augustin (6)
| US Airways Center17,007
| 4–19
|- style="background:#cfc;"
| 24 
| December 13
| @ Sacramento
| 
| Greg Monroe (24)
| Josh Smith (13)
| Brandon Jennings (8)
| Sleep Train Arena16,242
| 5–19
|- style="background:#fcc;"
| 25 
| December 15
| @ L.A. Clippers
|  
| Jodie Meeks (20)
| Andre Drummond (13)
| Brandon Jennings (6)
| Staples Center19,060
| 5–20
|- style="background:#fcc;"
| 26 
| December 17
| Dallas
|  
| Andre Drummond (19)
| Andre Drummond (24)
| Brandon Jennings (7)
| Palace of Auburn Hills12,287
| 5–21
|- style="background:#fcc;"
| 27 
| December 19
| Toronto
| 
| Brandon Jennings (22)
| Andre Drummond (11)
| Brandon Jennings (8)
| Palace of Auburn Hills16,274
| 5–22
|- style="background:#fcc;"
| 28
| December 21
| @ Brooklyn
| 
| Kentavious Caldwell-Pope (20)
| Andre Drummond (20)
| Brandon Jennings (9)
| Barclays Center17,732
| 5–23
|- style="background:#cfc;"
| 29 
| December 26
| Indiana
| 
| Andre Drummond (20)
| Greg Monroe (15)
| Brandon Jennings (10)
| Palace of Auburn Hills13,408
| 6–23
|- style="background:#cfc;"
| 30 
| December 28
| @ Cleveland
| 
| Brandon Jennings (25)
| Andre Drummond (17)
| Brandon Jennings (6)
| Quicken Loans Arena20,562
| 7–23
|- style="background:#cfc;"
| 31 
| December 30
| @ Orlando
| 
| Jodie Meeks (34)
| Andre Drummond (22)
| D. J. Augustin (10)
| Amway Center17,414
| 8–23

|- style="background:#cfc;"
| 32
| January 2
| @ New York
| 
| Brandon Jennings (29)
| Andre Drummond (20)
| D. J. Augustin (9)
| Madison Square Garden19,812
| 9–23
|- style="background:#cfc;"
| 33
| January 4
| Sacramento
|  
| Brandon Jennings (35)
| Andre Drummond (14)
| Brandon Jennings (7)
| Palace of Auburn Hills12,254
| 10–23
|- style="background:#cfc;"
| 34
| January 6
| @ San Antonio
| 
| Andre Drummond (20)
| Andre Drummond (17)
| Brandon Jennings (7)
| AT&T Center18,581
| 11–23
|- style="background:#cfc;"
| 35
| January 7
| @ Dallas
|  
| Greg Monroe (27)
| Andre Drummond (19)
| Monroe & Jennings (6)
| American Airlines Center20,279
| 12–23
|- style="background:#fcc;"
| 36
| January 9
| Atlanta
|  
| Kentavious Caldwell-Pope (20)
| Greg Monroe (12)
| Brandon Jennings (8)
| Palace of Auburn Hills18,859
| 12–24
|- style="background:#cfc;"
| 37
| January 10
| Brooklyn
| 
| Brandon Jennings (20)
| Greg Monroe (17)
| Brandon Jennings (11)
| Palace of Auburn Hills19,301
| 13–24
|- style="background:#cfc;"
| 38
| January 12
| @ Toronto
| 
| Brandon Jennings (34)
| Andre Drummond (14)
| Brandon Jennings (10)
| Air Canada Centre19,800
| 14–24
|- style="background:#fcc;"
| 39
| January 14
| New Orleans
| 
| Brandon Jennings (19)
| Greg Monroe (8)
| Greg Monroe (5)
| Palace of Auburn Hills12,016
| 14–25
|- style="background:#cfc;"
| 40
| January 16
| @ Indiana
| 
| Brandon Jennings (37)
| Andre Drummond (16)
| Brandon Jennings (2)
| Bankers Life Fieldhouse17,558
| 15–25
|- style="background:#cfc;"
| 41
| January 17
| Philadelphia
| 
| Kyle Singler (20)
| Andre Drummond (15)
| D. J. Augustin (10)
| Palace of Auburn Hills15,496
| 16–25
|- style="background:#fcc;"
| 42
| January 19
| @ Atlanta
| 
| Greg Monroe (16)
| Greg Monroe (20)
| Brandon Jennings (5)
| Philips Arena19,108
| 16–26
|- style="background:#cfc;"
| 43
| January 21
| Orlando
|  
| Andre Drummond (26)
| Andre Drummond (16)
| Brandon Jennings (21)
| Palace of Auburn Hills12,148
| 17–26
|- style="background:#fcc;"
| 44
| January 24
| @ Milwaukee
| 
| Brandon Jennings (16)
| Greg Monroe (16)
| Brandon Jennings (4)
| BMO Harris Bradley Center16,388
| 17–27
|- style="background:#fcc;"
| 45
| January 25
| @ Toronto
|  
| D. J. Augustin (35)
| Greg Monroe (16)
| D. J. Augustin (8)
| Air Canada Centre19,800
| 17–28
|- style="background:#fcc;"
| 46
| January 27
| Cleveland
| 
| D. J. Augustin (19)
| Andre Drummond (17)
| D. J. Augustin (9)
| Palace of Auburn Hills18,178
| 17–29
|- style="background:#fcc;"
| 47
| January 28
| @ Philadelphia
| 
| Greg Monroe (20)
| Greg Monroe (11)
| D. J. Augustin (4)
| Wells Fargo Center11,213
| 17–30
|- style="background:#cfc;"
| 48
| January 31
| Houston
| 
| Caldwell-Pope & Augustin (28)
| Andre Drummond (16)
| D. J. Augustin (12)
| Palace of Auburn Hills18,213
| 18–30

|- style="background:#cfc;"
| 49
| February 3
| Miami
| 
| D. J. Augustin (25)
| Andre Drummond (14)
| D. J. Augustin (13)
| Palace of Auburn Hills12,768
| 19–30
|- style="background:#fcc;"
| 50
| February 4
| @ Indiana
| 
| Andre Drummond (18)
| Andre Drummond (16)
| D. J. Augustin (6)
| Bankers Life Fieldhouse15,892
| 19–31
|- style="background:#cfc;"
| 51
| February 6
| Denver
| 
| D. J. Augustin (22)
| Greg Monroe (21)
| D. J. Augustin (11)
| Palace of Auburn Hills17,035
| 20–31
|- style="background:#fcc;"
| 52
| February 8
| Minnesota
| 
| D. J. Augustin (20)
| Andre Drummond (14)
| D. J. Augustin (8)
| Palace of Auburn Hills16,075
| 20–32
|- style="background:#cfc;"
| 53
| February 10
| @ Charlotte
| 
| Greg Monroe (23)
| Greg Monroe (12)
| D. J. Augustin (5)
| Time Warner Cable Arena15,876
| 21–32
|- style="background:#fcc;"
| 54
| February 11
| San Antonio
|  
| D. J. Augustin (22)
| Andre Drummond (9)
| Augustin & Lucas (6)
| Palace of Auburn Hills14,617
| 21–33
|- align="center"
|colspan="9" bgcolor="#bbcaff"|All-Star Break
|- style="background:#cfc;"
| 55 
| February 20
| Chicago
| 
| Butler & Monroe (20)
| Andre Drummond (20)
| Spencer Dinwiddie (9)
| Palace of Auburn Hills19,053
| 22–33
|- style="background:#cfc;"
| 56 
| February 22
| Washington
| 
| Kentavious Caldwell-Pope (26)
| Andre Drummond (16)
| Spencer Dinwiddie (7)
| Palace of Auburn Hills18,371
| 23–33
|- style="background:#fcc;"
| 57 
| February 24
| Cleveland
| 
| Reggie Jackson (22)
| Greg Monroe (14)
| Reggie Jackson (9)
| Palace of Auburn Hills19,087
| 23–34
|- style="background:#fcc;"
| 58
| February 27
| New York
| 
| Greg Monroe (28)
| Andre Drummond (15)
| Jackson & Lucas (5)
| Palace of Auburn Hills16,182
| 23–35
|- style="background:#fcc;"
| 59 
| February 28
| @ Washington
| 
| Greg Monroe (21)
| Greg Monroe (10)
| Spencer Dinwiddie (8)
| Verizon Center20,356
| 23–36

|- style="background:#fcc;"
| 60
| March 4
| @ New Orleans
| 
| Jodie Meeks (20)
| Andre Drummond (18)
| Reggie Jackson (11)
| New Orleans Arena16,925
| 23–37
|- style="background:#fcc;"
| 61
| March 6
| @ Houston
| 
| Greg Monroe (19)
| Andre Drummond (21)
| Reggie Jackson (7)
| Toyota Center18,193
| 23–38
|- style="background:#fcc;"
| 62
| March 8
| Charlotte
| 
| Reggie Jackson (25)
| Greg Monroe (11)
| Reggie Jackson (7)
| Palace of Auburn Hills15,673
| 23–39
|- style="background:#fcc;"
| 63
| March 10
| @ L.A. Lakers
|  
| Greg Monroe (24)
| Andre Drummond (21)
| Spencer Dinwiddie (6)
| Staples Center17,771
| 23–40
|- style="background:#fcc;"
| 64
| March 11
| @ Golden State
| 
| Andre Drummond (22)
| Andre Drummond (27)
| Reggie Jackson (9)
| Oracle Arena19,596
| 23–41
|- style="background:#fcc;"
| 65
| March 13
| @ Portland
| 
| Greg Monroe (19)
| Andre Drummond (17)
| Reggie Jackson (10) 
| Moda Center19,486
| 23–42
|- style="background:#fcc;"
| 66
| March 14
| @ Utah
| 
| Greg Monroe (16)
| Greg Monroe (13)
| Spencer Dinwiddie (6)
| EnergySolutions Arena19,911
| 23–43
|- style="background:#cfc;"
| 67
| March 17
| Memphis
| 
| Kentavious Caldwell-Pope (24)
| Andre Drummond (16)
| Reggie Jackson (20)
| Palace of Auburn Hills14,399
| 24–43
|- style="background:#fcc;"
| 68
| March 18
| @ Philadelphia
| 
| Kentavious Caldwell-Pope (20)
| Andre Drummond (14)
| Reggie Jackson (10)
| Wells Fargo Center10,776
| 24–44
|- style="background:#cfc;"
| 69
| March 21
| Chicago
| 
| Reggie Jackson (22)
| Tayshaun Prince (10)
| Reggie Jackson (11)
| Palace of Auburn Hills20,347
| 25–44
|- style="background:#cfc;"
| 70
| March 22
| @ Boston
| 
| Kentavious Caldwell-Pope (27)
| Andre Drummond (22)
| Reggie Jackson (11)
| TD Garden18,624
| 26–44
|- style="background:#cfc;"
| 71
| March 24
| Toronto
| 
| Reggie Jackson (28)
| Andre Drummond (18)
| Reggie Jackson (9)
| Palace of Auburn Hills14,420
| 27–44
|- style="background:#cfc;"
| 72
| March 27
| @ Orlando
| 
| Reggie Jackson (26)
| Reggie Jackson (11)
| Reggie Jackson (10)
| Amway Center16,427
| 28–44
|- style="background:#fcc;"
| 73
| March 29
| @ Miami
| 
| Andre Drummond (32)
| Andre Drummond (14)
| Reggie Jackson (9)
| American Airlines Arena19,685
| 28–45
|- style="background:#cfc;"
| 74
| March 31
| Atlanta
| 
| Andre Drummond (22)
| Andre Drummond (13)
| Reggie Jackson (11)
| Palace of Auburn Hills14,242
| 29–45

|- style="background:#fcc;"
| 75 
| April 1
| @ Charlotte
| 
| Jodie Meeks (15)
| Andre Drummond (9)
| Reggie Jackson (8)
| Time Warner Cable Arena15,372
| 29–46
|- style="background:#fcc;"
| 76 
| April 3
| @ Chicago
| 
| Reggie Jackson (22)
| Andre Drummond (22)
| Reggie Jackson (9)
| United Center22,058
| 29–47
|- style="background:#cfc;"
| 77
| April 4
| Miami
| 
| Reggie Jackson (29)
| Andre Drummond (17)
| Reggie Jackson (11)
| Palace of Auburn Hills16,133
| 30–47
|- style="background:#fcc;"
| 78
| April 8
| Boston
| 
| Andre Drummond (22)
| Andre Drummond (14)
| Reggie Jackson (15)
| Palace of Auburn Hills14,284
| 30–48
|- style="background:#fcc;"
| 79
| April 10
| Indiana
| 
| Reggie Jackson (21)
| Andre Drummond (15)
| Reggie Jackson (9)
| Palace of Auburn Hills18,561
| 30–49
|- style="background:#cfc;"
| 80
| April 12
| Charlotte
| 
| Jodie Meeks (24)
| Andre Drummond (19)
| Reggie Jackson (13)
| Palace of Auburn Hills17,297
| 31–49
|- style="background:#fcc;"
| 81
| April 13
| @ Cleveland
| 
| Andre Drummond (20)
| Andre Drummond (9)
| Reggie Jackson (8)
| Quicken Loans Arena20,562
| 31–50
|- style="background:#cfc;"
| 82
| April 15
| @ New York
| 
| Reggie Jackson (24)
| Andre Drummond (12)
| Reggie Jackson (11)
| Madison Square Garden19,812
| 32–50

Player statistics

Season

|- align="center" bgcolor=""
| 
| 27 || 27 || style="background:#eb003c;color:white;" |32.2 || .436 || .337 || .800 || 7.7 ||style="background:#eb003c;color:white;" |9.2 || .74 || .15 ||style="background:#eb003c;color:white;" |17.6
|- align="center" bgcolor="f0f0f0"
| 
| 69 || 57 || 31.0 || .496 || .000 || .750 || 10.2 || 2.1 || 1.13 || .49 || 15.9
|- align="center" bgcolor=""
| 
| 41 || 41 || 28.6 || .401 || .360 || .839 || 2.5 || 6.6 || 1.07 || .10 || 15.4
|- align="center" bgcolor="f0f0f0"
| 
|style="background:#eb003c;color:white;" |82 || style="background:#eb003c;color:white;" |82 || 30.5 || .514 || .000 || .389 || style="background:#eb003c;color:white;" | 13.5 || .7 || .89 || style="background:#eb003c;color:white;" |1.87 || 13.8
|- align="center" bgcolor=""
| 
| 28 || 28 || 32.0 || .391 || .243 || .470 || 7.2 || 4.7 ||style="background:#eb003c;color:white;" |1.32 || 1.71 || 13.1
|- align="center" bgcolor="f0f0f0"
| 
|style="background:#eb003c;color:white;" |82 || style="background:#eb003c;color:white;" |82 || 31.5 || .401 || .345 || .696 || 3.1 || 1.3 || 1.13 || .22 || 12.7
|- align="center" bgcolor=""
| 
| 60 || 0 || 24.4 || .416 || .349 || .906 || 1.7 || 1.3 || .98 || .10 || 11.1
|- align="center" bgcolor="f0f0f0"
| 
| 54 || 13 || 23.8 || .410 || .327 || .870 || 1.9 || 4.9 || .61 || .04 || 10.6
|- align="center" bgcolor=""
| 
| 52 || 11 || 22.3 || .423 || .360 || .783 || 3.7 || .9 || .38 || .29 || 7.7
|- align="center" bgcolor="f0f0f0"
| 
| 23 || 7 || 24.8 || .431 || style="background:#eb003c;color:white;" |.423 || .754 || 4.2 || 1.7 || .65 || .35 || 7.3
|- align="center" bgcolor=""
| 
| 54 || 40 || 23.8 || .400 || .406 || .810 || 2.6 || 1.2 || .61 || .26 || 7.1
|- align="center" bgcolor="f0f0f0"
| 
| 78 || 21 || 20.8 || .407 || .379 || .902 || 2.5 || 1.0 || .55 || .05 || 5.9
|- align="center" bgcolor=""
| 
| 46 || 0 || 15.3 || .460 || .368 || .860 || 3.1 || .9 || .59 || .24 || 5.2
|- align="center" bgcolor="f0f0f0"
| 
| 21 || 0 || 13.0 || .404 || .310 || style="background:#eb003c;color:white;" |1.000 || .08 || 2.9 || .38 || .00 || 4.7
|- align="center" bgcolor=""
| 
| 34 || 1 || 13.4 || .302 || .185 || .912 || 1.4 || 3.1 || .56 || .18 || 4.3
|- align="center" bgcolor="f0f0f0"
| 
| 3 || 0 || 5.7 || .417 || .250 || .000 || 1.3 || .7 || .33 || .00 || 3.7
|- align="center" bgcolor=""
| 
| 4 || 0 || 14.5 || .250 || .182 || .727 || 2.0 || 1.3 || .25 || .50 || 3.0
|- align="center" bgcolor="f0f0f0"
| 
| 19 || 0 || 8.6 || .317 || .154 || .875 || 1.4 || .4 || .21 || .21 || 2.6
|- align="center" bgcolor=""
| 
| 49 || 0 || 8.3 || style="background:#eb003c;color:white;" |.581''' || .000 || .682 || 1.9 || .1 || .24 || 1.00 || 1.8
|- align="center" bgcolor="f0f0f0"
| 
| 23 || 0 || 8.6 || .283 || .182 || .182 || .9 || .5 || .13 || .04 || 1.6
|}

Transactions

Overview

Trades

Players added

Players lost

References

Detroit Pistons seasons
Detroit Pistons
Detroit
Detroit